Declan Smith (born 14 September 1997) is a Welsh rugby union player who plays as a scrum-half.

Career
Smith made his debut for the Scarlets in 2016.
Smith earned his first call-up to the Wales U20s squad for the U20 Six Nations, and he was also called up to the squad for the 2017 U20 Six Nations.
In 2019 Smith played for New Zealand Mitre 10 Cup team  playing 2 games for the Mako in the 2019 season which the side won for the first time unbeaten.

References 

1997 births
Scarlets players
Llanelli RFC players
Living people
Tasman rugby union players
Rugby union scrum-halves
Rugby union players from Carmarthen